Arseto Football Club, which is commonly referred to simply as Arseto, was an Indonesian football club based in Solo, Central Java, Indonesia. They last played in the Liga Indonesia Premier Division.

The club was established in 1978 by Sigit Harjojudanto, who was the son of former President Suharto. At first, the club was based in Jakarta. However, the club moved to Solo in 1983 after Suharto declared 9 September as National Sports Day during the inauguration of Sriwedari Stadium. During its existence the club managed to win the 1990–92 Galatama title, as well as the 1985 Piala Galatama and 1985 Galatama-Perserikatan Invitational Championship. The team's home colours are blue, so they dubbed as Sky Blue Team and The White Buffalo. Arseto was dissolved in 1998 due to the political crisis and riots that year.

Honours

AFC (Asian competitions) 

 Asian Club Championship
 1992–93 – Group stage

Continental record

Notable former players 
Some Arseto players had competed for Indonesia national football team.
  Abdul Kadir
  Ricky Yacobi
  Eddy Harto
  Nasrul Koto
  Eduard Tjong
  Tonggo Tambunan
  Edu Hombert
  Yunus Mukhtar
  Benny V. B.
  Rochy Putiray

References

 
Association football clubs established in 1978
1978 establishments in Indonesia
Association football clubs disestablished in 1998
1998 disestablishments in Indonesia